John Smith Field, originally known as Hornet Field, is a baseball venue in Sacramento, the capital city of the U.S. state of California.  It is home to the Sacramento State Hornets college baseball team.  Opened in 1953, it has a capacity of 1,200 fans.  The facility is named for former Sacramento State baseball coach John Smith, who coached the program for 32 seasons.  The park was dedicated in 2010, after Smith's retirement following the 2010 season.

Renovations 
In 2002, the stadium's seating was expanded with 150 chairback seats and 1,050 bleacher seats.  The dugouts, playing surface, and fences were also renovated.  In 2005, a new LED scoreboard was installed.  In 2007, the players' clubhouse, which includes a lounge, lockers, and offices, was redesigned.  2011 renovations saw adjustments to the dugouts, clubhouse, batting cages, windscreen, and outfield fence. In 2016, lights were installed.

Events 
The venue hosted the 1986 and 1987 NCAA Division II West Regionals. The venue hosted a three-game Golden State Athletic Conference series between William Jessup University and Biola University.

See also 
 List of NCAA Division I baseball venues

References

College baseball venues in the United States
Defunct college football venues
American football venues in California
Baseball venues in California
Sacramento State Hornets baseball
Sacramento State Hornets football
Sports venues completed in 1953
1953 establishments in California